The Heavy Rotation Tour is the second headlining concert tour by American recording artist Anastacia. The tour is in support of her fourth studio album Heavy Rotation (2008). The singer played over 30 shows in Europe.

Background 

The tour was briefly mentioned in November 2008 by Anastacia. A month later, fan footage of Anastacia leaving a hotel in Switzerland was posted on YouTube. When fans asked about the touring Zurich, Anastacia replied, "We don't have Zurich on the map yet. […] I know one of the territories close to you is Geneva […] I'm not even going to Rome on this one. That doesn't mean I don't want to come that just how they’re doing the routing."  The tour was confirmed via Anastacia's official website on February 27, 2009.

Keely Myers and Chris Vaughan of "The Production Office" were responsible for the technical production of the tour. The creative director and producer of the show is Kim Gavin. Live Nation has been listed as the tour promoter. The tour venues are smaller compared to the ones performed during her first concert tour, but she said that she wanted to create a more intimate show for her fans. 

Anastacia made an appearance on This Morning on May 20, 2009 to promote the tour, where she also described the theme of the show as, "[...] a full day in the life..." because of the fact that many of her songs are "very storytelling" as well as "[...] a little bit Midler, a lot of theatre action going on, but video as well". On May 22, 2009 Anastacia announced on her official blog that her mother will also be appearing with her on stage during the shows in Italy, Graz, Prague and Calella de Palafrugell.

Critical response 
Caroline Sullivan of The Guardian reviewed the show at the HMV Hammersmith Apollo giving it four stars out of five

Opening acts 
Stevie Appleton 
Ricardo Azevedo 
Sofia Sida 
Miad Ballai 
IdaAida 
Zakkie 
King Jack 
Karima 
Caroline Chevin 
Irene Fornaciari 
Noémi Virág 
Claudia Cream 
Saulės Kliošas 
Ani Lorak

Setlist 

The following setlist was obtained from the concert held on June 28, 2009, at the NIA Academy in Birmingham, England. It does not represent all concerts for the duration of the tour.
"Video Sequence"
"One Day in Your Life"
"I Can Feel You"
"Same Song"
"I Thought I Told You That"
"You'll Never Be Alone"
"Defeated"
"Cowboys & Kisses"
"Why'd You Lie to Me"
"In Your Eyes"
"You'll Be Fine"
"Video Sequence"
"Paid My Dues"
"Beautiful Messed Up World"
"Sick and Tired"
"I Belong to You (Il Ritmo della Passione)"
"Not That Kind"
Encore
"Heavy Rotation"
"I'm Outta Love"
"Left Outside Alone"

Tour dates

Festivals and other miscellaneous performances
This concert was a part of "NDR Open Air"
This concert was a part of "Live at the Marquee"
This concert was a part of the "Lucca Summer Festival"
This concert was a part of the "Festival de Cap Roig"
This concert was a part of "Veranos de la Villa"
This concert was a part of "Feria de Julio"
This concert was a part of the "Osborne House Summer Concerts"

Cancellations and rescheduled shows

Personnel 
 Promoter: Live Nation Global Touring
 Creative Director: Kim Gavin
 Technical Production; Chris Vaughan & Keely Myers
 Musical Director: Orefo Orakwue
 Choreography: Gareth Walker
 Set Designer: Misty Buckley
 Dancers: Jay Revell and Tom Goddhall

Band 
 Backing Vocals:  Elizabeth Troy and Maria Quintile
 Bass Guitar: Orefo Orakwue
 Drums: Steve Barney
 Guitar: Dave Ital
 Keyboards: Hannah Vasabth and Marcus Byyrne

References

External links 

 Anastacia.com — Official Anastacia website
 Anastacia on MySpace
 Anastacia on YouTube

2009 concert tours
Anastacia concert tours